Geraghty and the variant Garaghty are Irish surnames, it was originally written in a Gaelic form as Mag Oireachtaigh (or MacGeraghty in English), the name is derived from the word "oireachtach," referring to a member of an assembly. The name of the modern national legislative body in Ireland, the Oireachtas comes from the same Gaelic root.

History
The MacGeraghty clan are descended from the Siol Muireadaigh of the Kingdom of Connacht, the same Gaelic lineage and homeland as the Ó Conchubhair dynasty. Their lands were originally situated in the Barony of Roscommon.

They were rulers of Clann Tomaltaigh and the Muintir Roduib and are referred to in the topographical poem Tuilleadh feasa ar Éirinn óigh by Giolla na Naomh Ó hUidhrín. 

Members of this Clan are said to have named the island of Innis Murray after themselves as they were formerly chiefs of the Siol Murray. 

The MacGeraghty clan are associated with the Gaelic Kingdoms of Uí Briúin and Uí Maine, in the latter they were second only to the O’Ceallaigh, who were the Kings of Uí Maine. 

A Chief of the name, called McGiriaght is listed in the Composition Book of Connacht in 1585, as seated in the Barony of Athlone. 

Geoffrey Keating’s History of Ireland records that:

"Mac Oiraghty of the steeds was the ruling chief
 
of Muintir Roduiv of rightful laws - 

A fearless warrior as he ranged the woods"''

The clan name MacGeraghty lead to the anglicised name Geraghty, descendants of the family are still found in large numbers in County Galway, County Mayo, County Roscommon, County Sligo and among the Irish diaspora.

Related surnames
Related surnames that derive from the same Gaelic root are:

 McGarrity
 Garrity
 Garraty
 Gerety
 Gerrity
 Gerahty
 Garraty
 MacGeraghty
 McGeraghty
 McGerity
 MacGartie
 MacGarty
 Gerighty
 Gerighaty
 Geraty
 Gerty
 Gurty 
 Jerety

People
The name Geraghty may refer to:

 Agnes Geraghty (1907–1974), swimmer
 Barry Geraghty (born 1979), jockey
 Ben Geraghty (1912–1963), baseball player
 Brian Geraghty (born 1974), actor
 Carmelita Geraghty (1901–1966), actress
 David Geraghty (born 1975), singer-songwriter
 Des Geraghty (born 1943), politician
 Donn Óge Mag Oireachtaigh (died 1230), Irish lord
 Graham Geraghty (born 1973), footballer
 Jack Geraghty (born 1934), mayor
 James Geraghty (1896–1960), politician
 Jim Geraghty, author and activist
 Johnny Geraghty (born 1942), sportsperson
 Kate Geraghty (born 1973), photojournalist
 Marita Geraghty, actress
 Martin Geraghty, comic book artist
 Michael Geraghty (born 1952), Attorney General of Alaska
 Paul Geraghty (born 1959), author and illustrator
 Robyn Geraghty, politician
 Sarah Geraghty, (born 1974), Northern District Judge of Georgia
 Shane Geraghty (born 1986), rugby union player
 Thomas F. Geraghty, jurist
 Thomas J. Geraghty (1883–1945), screenwriter
 Tony Geraghty, writer and journalist
 Garry Marsh, born Leslie March Geraghty, actor

See also
 Barony of Roscommon
 Clan Taidg
 Connacht
 Connachta
 Síol Murray
 Uí Briúin
 Uí Maine

References